Nupserha fricator is a species of beetle in the family Cerambycidae. It was described by Dalman in 1817. It is known from Java, Sulawesi, India, Myanmar, Philippines, Sumatra, Malaysia, and Thailand.

Subspecies
 Nupserha fricator celebiana Breuning, 1950
 Nupserha fricator fricator (Dalman, 1817)

References

fricator
Beetles described in 1817